Heaven Before I Die is a 1997 indie comedy film written and directed  by Izidore Musallam and starring Andy Velasquez, Giancarlo Giannini, Joanna Pacula and Omar Sharif.

Plot
This is the story of an outcast named Jacob, a Palestinian. Jacob's feet are so turned out that he walks like Charlie Chaplin. He is different because of that and decides to emigrate from Palestine to Canada, where "everyone is equal". There everybody treats him kindly, and a thief specializing in stealing money from cash machines takes him into his home and treats him like a son, waitress Selma finds him a job as a Chaplin imitator, "prophet" Khalil Gibran gives him wise advice.

Cast

  Andy Velasquez as Jacob 
 Giancarlo Giannini  as Thief 
 Joanna Pacula 	 as Selma 
 Geoffrey Lower 	 as Sterrea 
 Burt Young as Pollof 
 Omar Sharif as Kahlil Gibran 
 Joseph Bologna 	  
 Cherilee Taylor 	  
 Leonard Cohen

References

External links

1997 comedy films
1997 films
American comedy films
1990s English-language films
1990s American films